William Price Elmer (March 2, 1871 – May 11, 1956) was a U.S. Representative from Missouri.

Born in Robertsville, Missouri to William J. and Sarah (Wagoner) Elmer, the family moved to Salem, Missouri in 1875. Elmer attended the public schools and Wingo Law School in Salem, Missouri. He was admitted to the bar in 1892 and commenced practice in Salem, Missouri which is the county seat of Dent County. He served as prosecuting attorney for Dent County, Missouri, in 1895 and 1896 and again in 1905 and 1906. He served as member of the State house of representatives in 1903, 1904, 1921, 1922, and 1929–1933, including the position of temporary speaker and floor leader in 1929. Elmer served as city attorney of Salem, Missouri from 1920 to 1930. He served as delegate or alternate to the Republican National Conventions in 1904, 1908, 1912, and 1920. He served as chairman of the Republican county committee 1908–1944. He served as member of the 1929 commission to revise Missouri laws. He was an unsuccessful candidate for Lieutenant Governor in 1940.

Elmer was elected as a Republican to the Seventy-eighth Congress (January 3, 1943 – January 3, 1945). He was an unsuccessful candidate for reelection in 1944 to the Seventy-ninth Congress. He was an unsuccessful candidate for the Republican nomination for United States Senator in 1946. He resumed the practice of law. He served as director of First National Bank of Salem. He served as member of board of curators of University of Missouri 1949–1955. He wrote a popular series in the Salem News on "History of Dent County."

Elmer married Amie Adelmann on December 9, 1896.  She was the daughter of Franz and Frances (Duckworth) Adelmann. W. P. and Amie Elmer had nine children: William Doss Elmer, Victorene Dale Elmer, McVeigh Adelmann Elmer, Billie Ruth Elmer, Vivian Katrina Elmer, Helen Willene Elmer, Amelia Imogene Elmer, Lucille Elmer, and Dorothy Elizabeth Elmer. He died in Salem, Missouri, May 11, 1956. He was interred in Cedar Grove Cemetery in Salem, Missouri. His home from 1906 until his death was converted into the Dent County Museum.

References

1871 births
1956 deaths
20th-century American politicians
University of Missouri curators
Republican Party members of the Missouri House of Representatives
Missouri lawyers
Republican Party members of the United States House of Representatives from Missouri
People from Franklin County, Missouri
People from Salem, Missouri